Anayeli Muñoz Moreno (born March 8, 1984) is a Mexican politician, member of the Citizens' Movement party.

Studies 

She studied at the Autonomous University of Aguascalientes (UAA), studying a degree in Communication and graduating in 2007, she would study a master's degree in Public Administration at the Universidad del Valle de México (UVM) and graduating in 2021 and would also be a professor teaching for licenciatures to Communications, she is currently pursuing a master's degree in Public Policy at the Latin American Faculty of Social Sciences.

Career

Background to politics 

In 2003, she would work in the media, being a presenter, reporter, host and editor, she was also a correspondent for Notimex in Aguascalientes.

Political career 

She was a local deputy of the Congress of Aguascalientes of the Ecologist Green Party of Mexico from 2013 to 2018. In 2018 she arrived at the Congress of Mexico as a replacement for Senator Lorena Martínez Rodríguez, being a member of the Movimiento Ciudadano (MC) party, and the becoming into the Technical Secretary of Unity of Gender, in 2022 she has been launched as a candidate for governor of Aguascalientes.

References

External links 
 
 
 
 

1984 births
Living people
Women members of the Senate of the Republic (Mexico)
Members of the Congress of Aguascalientes
21st-century Mexican women politicians
21st-century Mexican politicians
Ecologist Green Party of Mexico politicians
Citizens' Movement (Mexico) politicians
Autonomous University of Aguascalientes alumni
Universidad del Valle de México alumni
People from Aguascalientes City
Politicians from Aguascalientes